The Eighty Years' War or Dutch Revolt (c.1566/1568–1648) was an armed conflict in the Habsburg Netherlands between disparate groups of rebels and the Spanish government. The causes of the war included the Reformation, centralisation, taxation, and the rights and privileges of the nobility and cities. 

After the initial stages, Philip II of Spain, the sovereign of the Netherlands, deployed his armies and regained control over most of the rebel-held territories. However, widespread mutinies in the Spanish army caused a general uprising. Under the leadership of the exiled William the Silent, the Catholic and Protestant-dominated provinces sought to establish religious peace while jointly opposing the king's regime with the Pacification of Ghent, but the general rebellion failed to sustain itself.

Despite Governor of Spanish Netherlands and General for Spain, the Duke of Parma's steady military and diplomatic successes, the Union of Utrecht continued their resistance, proclaiming their independence through the 1581 Act of Abjuration, and establishing the Protestant-dominated Dutch Republic in 1588. In the Ten Years thereafter, the Republic (whose heartland was no longer threatened) made conquests in the north and east and received diplomatic recognition from France and England in 1596. The Dutch colonial empire emerged, which began with Dutch attacks on Portugal's overseas territories.

Facing a stalemate, the two sides agreed to a Twelve Years' Truce in 1609; when it expired in 1621, fighting resumed as part of the broader Thirty Years' War. An end was reached in 1648 with the Peace of Münster (a treaty part of the Peace of Westphalia), when Spain retained Southern Netherlands and recognised the Dutch Republic as an independent country.

Origins

Insurrection, repression and invasion (1566–1572)

Rebellion (1572–1576)

From Pacification of Ghent to Union of Utrecht (1576–1579)

Secession and reconquest (1579–1588)

The Ten Years (1588–1598)

Run-up to the Truce (1599–1609)

Twelve Years' Truce (1609–1621) 

The military upkeep and decreased trade had put both Spain and the Dutch Republic under financial strain. To alleviate conditions, a ceasefire was signed in Antwerp on 9 April 1609, marking the end of the Dutch Revolt and the beginning of the Twelve Years' Truce. The conclusion of this Truce was a major diplomatic coup for Holland's advocate Johan van Oldenbarnevelt, as Spain by concluding the Treaty, formally recognised the independence of the Republic. In Spain the truce was seen as a major humiliation—she had suffered a political, military and ideological defeat, and the affront to its prestige was immense. The closure of the river Scheldt to traffic in and out of Antwerp, and the acceptance of Dutch commercial operations in the Spanish and Portuguese colonial maritime lanes were just a few points that the Spanish found objectionable.

Although there was peace on an international level, political unrest took hold of Dutch domestic affairs. What had started as a theological quarrel resulted in riots between Remonstrants (Arminians) and Counter-Remonstrants (Gomarists). In general, regents would support the former and civilians the latter. Even the government got involved, with Oldenbarnevelt taking the side of the Remonstrants and stadtholder Maurice of Nassau their opponents. In the end, the Synod of Dort condemned the Remonstrants for heresy and excommunicated them from the national Public Church. Van Oldenbarnevelt was sentenced to death, together with his ally Gilles van Ledenberg, while two other Remonstrant allies, Rombout Hogerbeets and Hugo Grotius received life imprisonment.

Final phase of the war (1621–1648)

Peace of Münster

The negotiations between Spain and the Republic formally started in January 1646 as part of the more general peace negotiations between the warring parties in the Thirty Years' War. The States General sent eight delegates from several of the provinces as none trusted the others to represent them adequately. They were Willem van Ripperda (Overijssel), Frans van Donia (Friesland), Adriaen Clant tot Stedum (Groningen), Adriaen Pauw and Jan van Mathenesse (Holland), Barthold van Gent (Gelderland), Johan de Knuyt (Zeeland) and Godert van Reede (Utrecht). The Spanish delegation was led by Gaspar de Bracamonte, 3rd Count of Peñaranda. The negotiations were held in what is now the Haus der Niederlande in Münster.

The Dutch and Spanish delegations soon reached an agreement, based on the text of the Twelve Years' Truce. It therefore confirmed Spain's recognition of Dutch independence. The Dutch demands (closure of the Scheldt, cession of the Meierij, formal cession of Dutch conquests in the Indies and Americas, and lifting of the Spanish embargoes) were generally met. However, the general negotiations between the main parties dragged on, because France kept formulating new demands. Eventually it was decided therefore to split off the peace between the Republic and Spain from the general peace negotiations. This enabled the two parties to conclude what technically was a separate peace (to the annoyance of France, which maintained that this contravened the alliance treaty of 1635 with the Republic).

The text of the Treaty (in 79 articles) was fixed on 30 January 1648. It was then sent to the principals (King Philip IV of Spain and the States General) for ratification. Five provinces voted to ratify (against the advice of stadtholder William) on 4 April (Zeeland and Utrecht being opposed). Utrecht finally yielded to pressure by the other provinces, but Zeeland held out and refused to sign. It was eventually decided to ratify the peace without Zeeland's consent. The delegates to the peace conference affirmed the peace on oath on 15 May 1648 (though the delegate of Zeeland refused to attend, and the delegate of Utrecht suffered a possibly diplomatic illness).

In the broader context of the treaties between France and the Holy Roman Empire, and Sweden and the Holy Roman Empire of 14 and 24 October 1648, which comprise the Peace of Westphalia, but which were not signed by the Republic, the Republic now also gained formal "independence" from the Holy Roman Empire, just like the Swiss Cantons. In both cases this was just a formalisation of a situation that had already existed for a long time. France and Spain did not conclude a treaty and so remained at war until the peace of the Pyrenees of 1659. The peace was celebrated in the Republic with sumptuous festivities. It was solemnly promulgated on the 80th anniversary of the execution of the Counts of Egmont and Horne on 5 June 1648.

Aftermath

Historiography

See also

Notes

References

Bibliography 

 
  (5th edition; original published in 1857)
 
 
 
  (in cooperation with H.L.Ph. Leeuwenberg and H.B. van der Weel)
 
 
 
  [2001] paperback
 
 
 
 
 
  paperback

Further reading
 Duke, Alastair, (1992), Select documents for the Reformation and the Revolt of the Low Countries, 1555–1609
 Geyl, Pieter, (1932), The Revolt of the Netherlands, 1555–1609. Williams & Norgate, UK.
 Geyl, Pieter, (1936), The Netherlands Divided, 1609–1648. Williams & Norgate, UK.
 Kossmann, E.H. & Mellink, A.H., (1974) Texts concerning the Revolt of the Netherlands Cambridge University Press, Cambridge. 
 Parker, Geoffrey, (1977), The Dutch Revolt, Penguin Books, London.
 Rodríguez Pérez, Yolanda, The Dutch Revolt through Spanish Eyes: Self and Other in historical and literary texts of Golden Age Spain (c. 1548–1673) (Oxford etc., Peter Lang, 2008) (Hispanic Studies: Culture and Ideas, 16).
 Marnef, Guido, "Belgian and Dutch Post-war Historiography on the Protestant and Catholic Reformation in the Netherlands," Archiv für Reformationsgeschichte (2009) Vol. 100, pp. 271–292.

External links 

 De Bello Belgico  – about the Revolt in the Netherlands, website of Leiden University
 Correspondence of William of Orange 
 La Guerra de Flandes, desde la muerte del emperador Carlos V hasta la Tregua de los Doce Años 
 "Nederlandse Opstand" on www.onsverleden.net 

 
Global conflicts
European wars of religion
Wars of independence
16th century in Europe
17th century in Europe
Wars involving France
Wars involving Great Britain
Wars involving Portugal
Wars involving Spain
Wars involving the Dutch Republic
Wars involving the Habsburg monarchy
Wars involving the Holy Roman Empire
Wars involving the Netherlands
16th-century rebellions
17th-century rebellions
Calvinism in the Dutch Republic